Mifflin Township is one of the eighteen townships of Richland County, Ohio, United States.  It is a part of the Mansfield Metropolitan Statistical Area.  The 2000 census found 6,218 people in the township.

Geography
Located in the eastern part of the county, it borders the following townships:
Weller Township – north
Milton Township, Ashland County – northeast corner
Mifflin Township, Ashland County – east
Monroe Township – south
Washington Township – southwest corner
Madison Township – west

No municipalities are located in Mifflin Township.

Name and history
Statewide, other Mifflin Townships are located in Ashland, Franklin, Pike, and Wyandot counties.

Government
The township is governed by a three-member board of trustees, who are elected in November of odd-numbered years to a four-year term beginning on the following January 1. Two are elected in the year after the presidential election and one is elected in the year before it. There is also an elected township fiscal officer, who serves a four-year term beginning on April 1 of the year after the election, which is held in November of the year before the presidential election. Vacancies in the fiscal officership or on the board of trustees are filled by the remaining trustees.

Public services
Law enforcement in Mifflin Township is the responsibility of the Richland County Sheriff's Office, and fire protection and ambulance services are provided by the Mifflin Township Fire Department

References

External links
Township website
County website

Townships in Richland County, Ohio
Townships in Ohio